The Zohar (Zōhar, lit. "Splendor" or "Radiance") is a foundational work in the literature of Jewish mystical thought known as Kabbalah. It is a group of books including commentary on the mystical aspects of the Torah (the five books of Moses) and scriptural interpretations as well as material on mysticism, mythical cosmogony, and mystical psychology. The Zohar contains discussions of the nature of God, the origin and structure of the universe, the nature of souls, redemption, the relationship of Ego to Darkness and "true self" to "The Light of God".

The Zohar was first publicized by Moses de León (c. 1240 – 1305 CE), who claimed it was a Tannaitic work recording the teachings of Simeon ben Yochai. This claim is universally rejected by modern scholars, most of whom believe de León, also an infamous forger of Geonic material, wrote the book himself between 1280 and 1286. Some scholars argue that the Zohar is the work of multiple medieval authors and/or contains a small amount of genuinely antique novel material. Later additions to the Zohar, including the Tiqqune hazZohar and the Ra'ya Mehimna, were composed by a 14th century imitator.

Language
According to Gershom Scholem and other modern scholars, Zoharic Aramaic is an artificial dialect largely based on a linguistic fusion of the Babylonian Talmud and Targum Onkelos, but confused by de León's simple and imperfect grammar, his limited vocabulary, and his reliance on loanwords, including from contemporaneous medieval languages.

Authorship

Initial view
Authorship of the Zohar was questioned from the outset, due to the claim that it was discovered by one person and referred to historical events of the post-Talmudic period while purporting to be from an earlier date. Abraham Zacuto's 1504 work Sefer Yuhasin (first printed 1566) quotes from the Kabbalist Isaac ben Samuel of Acre's 13th century memoir Divre hayYamim (lost), which claims that the widow and daughter of de León revealed that he had written it himself and only ascribed the authorship to Simeon ben Yochai for personal profit:

Isaac goes on to say that he obtained mixed evidence of Zohar's authenticity from other Spanish Kabbalists, and, though he treats it as genuine in his Otzar haChayyim, he rarely quotes it. Isaac's testimony was censored from the second edition (1580) and remained absent from all editions thereafter until its restoration nearly 300 years later in the 1857 edition.

Within fifty years of its appearance in Spain it was quoted by Kabbalists, including the Italian mystical writer Menahem Recanati and Todros ben Joseph Abulafia. However Joseph ibn Wakar harshly attacked the Zohar, which he considered inauthentic, and some Jewish communities, such as the Dor Daim, Andalusian (Western Sefardic or Spanish and Portuguese Jews), and some Italian communities, never accepted it as authentic. The manuscripts of the Zohar are from the 14th-16th centuries.

Late Middle Ages
By the 15th century, its authority in the Iberian Jewish community was such that Joseph ibn Shem-Tov drew from it arguments in his attacks against Maimonides, and even representatives of non-mystical Jewish thought began to assert its sacredness and invoke its authority in the decision of some ritual questions. In Jacobs' and Broyde's view, they were attracted by its glorification of man, its doctrine of immortality, and its ethical principles, which they saw as more in keeping with the spirit of Talmudic Judaism than are those taught by the philosophers, and which was held in contrast to the view of Maimonides and his followers, who regarded man as a fragment of the universe whose immortality is dependent upon the degree of development of his active intellect. The Zohar instead declared Man to be the lord of creation, whose immortality is solely dependent upon his morality.

Conversely, Elia del Medigo (c.1458 – c.1493), in his Beḥinat ha-Dat endeavored to show that the Zohar could not be attributed to Simeon ben Yochai, by a number of arguments. He claims that if it were his work, the Zohar would have been mentioned by the Talmud, as has been the case with other works of the Talmudic period; he claims that had ben Yochai known by divine revelation the hidden meaning of the precepts, his decisions on Jewish law from the Talmudic period would have been adopted by the Talmud, that it would not contain the names of rabbis who lived at a later period than that of ben Yochai; he claims that if the Kabbalah were a revealed doctrine, there would have been no divergence of opinion among the Kabbalists concerning the mystic interpretation of the precepts.

Believers in the authenticity of the Zohar countered that the lack of references to the work in Jewish literature was because ben Yochai did not commit his teachings to writing but transmitted them orally to his disciples over generations until finally the doctrines were embodied in the Zohar. They found it unsurprising that ben Yochai should have foretold future happenings or made references to historical events of the post-Talmudic period.

By the late 16th century, the Zohar was present in one-tenth of all private Jewish libraries in Mantua. The authenticity of the Zohar was accepted by such 16th century Jewish luminaries as Joseph Karo (d. 1575), and Solomon Luria (d. 1574), who wrote nonetheless that Jewish law does not follow the Zohar when it is contradicted by the Babylonian Talmud. Luria writes that the Zohar cannot even override a minhag. Moses Isserles (d. 1572) writes that he "heard" that the author of the Zohar is ben Yochai. Elijah Levita (d. 1559) did not believe in its antiquity, nor did Joseph Scaliger (d. 1609) or Johannes Drusius (d. 1616).

Enlightenment Period
Debate continued over the generations; Delmedigo's arguments were echoed by Leon of Modena (d. 1648) in his Ari Nohem and Jean Morin (d. 1659), and Jacob Emden (d. 1776), who may have been familiar with Morin's arguments, devoted a book to the criticism of the Zohar, called Mitpachas Sefarim (מטפחת ספרים) to fight the remaining adherents of the Sabbatai Zevi movement (in which Zevi, a false messiah and Jewish apostate, cited Messianic prophecies from the Zohar as proof of his legitimacy), and endeavored to show that the book on which Zevi based his doctrines was a forgery. Emden argued that the Zohar misquotes passages of Scripture; misunderstands the Talmud; contains some ritual observances that were ordained by later rabbinical authorities; mentions The Crusades against Muslims (who did not exist in the 2nd century); uses the expression "esnoga", a Portuguese term for "synagogue"; and gives a mystical explanation of the Hebrew vowel points, which were not introduced until long after the Talmudic period. Saul Berlin (d. 1794) argued that the presence of an introduction in the Zohar, unknown to the Talmudic literary genre, itself indicates a medieval date.

In the Ashkenazi community of Eastern Europe, religious authorities including Elijah of Vilna (d. 1797) and Shneur Zalman of Liadi (d. 1812) believed in the authenticity of the Zohar, while Ezekiel Landau (d. 1793), in his sefer Derushei HaTzlach (דרושי הצל"ח), argued that the Zohar is to be considered unreliable as it came into our hands many hundreds of years after Ben Yochai's death and lacks an unbroken tradition of authenticity, among other reasons. Isaac Haver (d. 1852) admits the vast majority of content comes from the 13th century but argues that there was a genuine core. Solomon Judah Loeb Rapoport spoke against the Zohar's antiquity.

The influence of the Zohar in Yemen contributed to the formation of the Dor Deah movement, led by Yiḥyah Qafiḥ in the later part of the 19th century. Among its objects was the opposition of the influence of the Zohar, as presented in Qafiḥ's Milhamoth Hashem (Wars of the Lord) and Da'at Elohim.

Modern religious views

Yechiel Michel Epstein (d. 1908), and Yisrael Meir Kagan (d. 1933) both believed in the authenticity of the Zohar, as did Menachem Mendel Kasher (d. 1983), Aryeh Kaplan (d. 1983), David Luria (d. 1855), and Chaim Kanievsky (d. 2022). Aryeh Carmell (d. 2006) did not, and Eliyahu Dessler (d. 1953) accepted the possibility that it was composed in the 13th century. Gedaliah Nadel (d. 2004) was unsure if the Zohar were genuine but was sure that it is acceptable to believe that it is not. Ovadia Yosef (d. 2013) held that Orthodox Jews should accept the Zohar's antiquity in practice based on medieval precedent, but agreed that rejecting it is rational and religiously valid. Joseph Hertz (d. 1946) called the claim of ben Yochai's authorship "untenable", citing Scholem's evidence. Samuel Belkin (d. 1976) argued that the Mystical Midrash section, specifically, predated de León. Joseph B. Soloveitchik (d. 1993) apparently dismissed the Zohar's antiquity. Moses Gaster (d. 1939) wrote that the claim of ben Yochai's authorship was "untenable" but that de León had compiled earlier material. Meir Mazuz (alive) accepts Emden's arguments.

Modern critical views
The first systematic and critical academic proof for the authorship of Moses de León was given by Adolf Jellinek in his 1851 monograph "Moses ben Shem-tob de León und sein Verhältnis zum Sohar". Jellinek's proofs were accepted by every other major scholar in the field, including Heinrich Graetz ("History of the Jews", vol. 7), Moritz Steinschneider, Bernhard Beer, and Christian David Ginsburg. Ginsburg summarized Jellinek's, Graetz's, and other scholars' proofs for the English-reading world, also introducing several novel proofs, including that the Zohar includes a translation of a poem by Solomon ibn Gabirol (d. 1058) and that it includes a mystical explanation of a mezuza style only introduced in the 13th century, 

The kabbalah scholar Gershom Scholem began his career at the Hebrew University in Jerusalem with a lecture in which he promised to refute Graetz and Jellinek, but after years of research contended in 1941 that de León himself was the most likely author. Scholem noted the Zohar's frequent errors in Aramaic grammar, its suspicious traces of Arabic and Spanish words and sentence patterns, and its lack of knowledge of the land of Israel.

Scholem views the author as having based the Zohar on a wide variety of pre-existing Jewish sources, while at the same time inventing a number of fictitious works that the Zohar supposedly quotes, e.g., the Sifra de-Adam, the Sifra de-Hanokh, the Sifra di-Shelomo Malka, the Sifra de-Rav Hamnuna Sava, the Sifra de-Rav Yeiva Sava, the Sifra de-Aggadeta, the Raza de-Razin and many others.

Scholem's views are widely held as accurate among historians of the Kabbalah, but they are not uncritically accepted. Scholars who continue to research the background of the Zohar include Yehuda Liebes (who wrote his doctorate thesis for Scholem on the subject, Dictionary of the Vocabulary of the Zohar in 1976), and Daniel C. Matt, also a student of Scholem's who has  reconstructed a critical edition of the Zohar based on manuscripts.

Academic studies of the Zohar show that many of its ideas are based in the Talmud, various works of midrash, and earlier Jewish mystical works. Scholem writes:

The writer had expert knowledge of the early material and he often used it as a foundation for his expositions, putting into it variations of his own. His main sources were the Babylonian Talmud, the complete Midrash Rabbah, the Midrash Tanhuma, and the two Pesiktot (Pesikta De-Rav Kahana or Pesikta Rabbati), the Midrash on Psalms, the Pirkei de-Rabbi Eliezer, and the Targum Onkelos. Generally speaking, they are not quoted exactly, but translated into the peculiar style of the Zohar and summarized. [...]

Less use is made of the halakhic Midrashim, the Jerusalem Talmud, and the other Targums, nor of the Midrashim like the Aggadat Shir ha-Shirim, the Midrash on Proverbs, and the Alfabet de-R. Akiva. It is not clear whether the author used the Yalkut Simeoni, or whether he knew the sources of its aggadah separately. Of the smaller Midrashim he used the Heikhalot Rabbati, the Alfabet de-Ben Sira, the Sefer Zerubabel, the Baraita de-Ma'aseh Bereshit, [and many others] [...]

The Zohar also draws from the Bible commentaries written by medieval rabbis, including Rashi, Abraham ibn Ezra, David Kimhi and even authorities as late as Nahmanides and Maimonides, and earlier mystical texts such as the Sefer Yetzirah and the Bahir and the medieval writings of the Hasidei Ashkenaz.

Another influence that Scholem, and scholars like Yehudah Liebes and Ronit Meroz have identified was a circle of Spanish Kabbalists in Castile who dealt with the appearance of an evil side emanating from within the world of the sephirot. Scholem saw this dualism of good and evil within the Godhead as a kind of "gnostic" inclination within Kabbalah, and as a predecessor of the Sitra Ahra (the other, evil side) in the Zohar. The main text of the Castile circle, the Treatise on the Left Emanation, was written by Jacob ha-Cohen in around 1265.

Contents

Printings, editions, and indexing
The Tikunei haZohar was first printed in Mantua in 1557. The main body of the Zohar was printed in Cremona in 1558 (a one-volume edition), in Mantua in 1558-1560 (a three-volume edition), and in Salonika in 1597 (a two-volume edition). Each of these editions included somewhat different texts. When they were printed there were many partial manuscripts in circulation that were not available to the first printers. These were later printed as "Zohar Chadash" (lit. "New Zohar"), but Zohar Chadash actually contains parts that pertain to the Zohar, as well as Tikunim (plural of Tikun, "Repair") that are akin to Tikunei haZohar, as described below. The term "Zohar", in usage, may refer to just the first Zohar collection, with or without the applicable sections of Zohar Chadash, or to the entire Zohar and Tikunim.
Citations referring to the Zohar conventionally follow the volume and page numbers of the Mantua edition; while citations referring to Tikkunei haZohar follow the edition of Ortakoy (Constantinople) 1719 whose text and pagination became the basis for most subsequent editions.  Volumes II and III begin their numbering anew, so citation can be made by parashah and page number (e.g. Zohar: Nasso 127a), or by volume and page number (e.g. Zohar III:127a).

The New Zohar (זוהר חדש)
After the book of the Zohar had been printed (in Mantua and in Cremona, in the Jewish years 5318-5320 or 1558-1560? CE), many more manuscripts were found that included paragraphs pertaining to the Zohar which had not been included in printed editions. The manuscripts pertained also to all parts of the Zohar; some were similar to Zohar on the Torah, some were similar to the inner parts of the Zohar (Midrash haNe'elam, Sitrei Otiyot and more), and some pertained to Tikunei haZohar. Some thirty years after the first edition of the Zohar was printed, the manuscripts were gathered and arranged according to the parashas of the Torah and the megillot (apparently the arrangement was done by the Kabbalist, Avraham haLevi of Tsfat), and were printed first in Salonika in Jewish year 5357 (1587? CE), and then in Kraków (5363), and afterwards in various editions.

Structure 
According to Scholem, the Zohar can be divided into 21 types of content, of which the first 18 (a.-s.) are the work of the original author (probably de Leon) and the final 3 (t.-v.) are the work of a later imitator.

a. Untitled Torah commentary

A "bulky part" which is "wholly composed of discursive commentaries on various passages from the Torah".

b. Book of Concealment (ספרא דצניעותא)A short part of only six pages, containing a commentary to the first six chapters of Genesis. It is "highly oracular and obscure," citing no authorities and explaining nothing.

c. Greater Assembly (אדרא רבא)This part contains an explanation of the oracular hints in the previous section. Ben Yochai's friends gather together to discuss secrets of Kabbalah.  After the opening of the discussion by ben Yochai, the sages rise, one after the other, and lecture on the secret of Divinity, while ben Yochai adds to and responds to their words. The sages become steadily more ecstatic until three of them die. Scholem calls this part "architecturally perfect."

d. Lesser Assembly (אדרא זוטא)Ben Yochai dies and a speech is quoted in which he explains the previous section.

e. Assembly of the Tabernacle (אדרא דמשכנא)

This part has the same structure as c. but discusses instead the mysticism of prayer.

f. Palaces (היכלות)

Seven palaces of light are described, which are perceived by the devout in death. This description appears again in another passage, heavily embellished.

g. Secretum Secretorum (רזא דרזין)

An anonymous discourse on physiognomy and a discourse on chiromancy by ben Yochai.

h. Old Man (סבא)

An elaborate narrative about a speech by an old Kabbalist.

i. Child (ינוקא)

A story of a prodigy and his Kabbalistic speech.

k. Head of the Academy (רב מתיבתא)

A Pardes narrative in which a head of the celestial academy reveals secrets about the destinies of the soul.

l. Secrets of Torah (סתרי תורה)

Allegorical and mystical interpretations of Torah passages.

m. Mishnas (מתניתין)

Imitations of the Mishnaic style, designed to introduce longer commentaries in the style of the Talmud.

n. Zohar to the Song of Songs

Kabbalistic commentary to the Song of Songs.

o. Standard of Measure (קו המידה)

Profound interpretation of Deut. 6:4.

p. Secrets of Letters (סתרי אותיות)

A monologue by ben Yochai on the letters in the names of God and their use in creation.

q. Commentary to the Merkabah

r. Mystical Midrash (מדרש הנעלם)

A Kabbalistic commentary on the Torah, citing a wide variety of Talmudic sages. According to Ramaz, it is fit to be called Midrash haNe'elam because "its topic is mostly the neshamah (an upper level of soul), the source of which is in Beri'ah, which is the place of the upper Gan Eden; and it is written in the Pardes that drash is in Beri'ah... and the revealed midrash is the secret of externality, and Midrash haNe'elam is the secret of internality, which is the neshamah. And this derush is founded on the neshamah; its name befits it – Midrash haNe'elam.

The language of Midrash haNe'elam is sometimes Hebrew, sometimes Aramaic, and sometimes both mixed. Unlike the body of the Zohar, its drashas are short and not long. Also, the topics it discusses — the work of Creation, the nature the soul, the days of Mashiach, and Olam Haba — are not of the type found in the Zohar, which are the nature of God, the emanation of worlds, the "forces" of evil, and more.

s. Mystic Midrash on Ruth

A commentary on The Book of Ruth in the same style.

t. Faithful Shepherd (רעיא מהימנא)By far the largest "book" included in the Zohar, this is a Kabbalistic commentary on Moses' teachings revealed to ben Yochai and his friends. Moshe Cordovero said, "Know that this book, which is called Ra'aya Meheimna, which ben Yochai made with the tzadikim who are in Gan Eden, was a repair of the Shekhinah, and an aid and support for it in the exile, for there is no aid or support for the Shekhinah besides the secrets of the Torah... And everything that he says here of the secrets and the concepts—it is all with the intention of unifying the Shekhinah and aiding it during the exile.

u. Rectifications of the Zohar (תקוני זוהר)

Tikunei haZohar, which was printed as a separate book, includes seventy commentaries called "Tikunim" (lit. Repairs) and an additional eleven Tikkunim. In some editions, Tikunim are printed that were already printed in the Zohar Chadash, which in their content and style also pertain to Tikunei haZohar.

Each of the seventy Tikunim of Tikunei haZohar begins by explaining the word "Bereishit" (בראשית), and continues by explaining other verses, mainly in parashat Bereishit, and also from the rest of Tanakh. And all this is in the way of Sod, in commentaries that reveal the hidden and mystical aspects of the Torah.

Tikunei haZohar and Ra'aya Meheimna are similar in style, language, and concepts, and are different from the rest of the Zohar. For example, the idea of the Four Worlds is found in Tikunei haZohar and Ra'aya Meheimna but not elsewhere, as is true of the very use of the term "Kabbalah". In terminology, what is called Kabbalah in Tikunei haZohar and Ra'aya Meheimna is simply called razin (clues or hints) in the rest of the Zohar. In Tikunei haZohar there are many references to "chibura kadma'ah" (meaning "the earlier book"). This refers to the main body of the Zohar.

v. Further Additions

These include later Tikkunim and other texts in the same style.

Influence

Judaism
On the one hand, the Zohar was lauded by many rabbis because it opposed religious formalism, stimulated one's imagination and emotions, and for many people helped reinvigorate the experience of prayer. In many places prayer had become a mere external religious exercise, while prayer was supposed to be a means of transcending earthly affairs and placing oneself in union with God.

According to the Jewish Encyclopedia, "On the other hand, the Zohar was censured by many rabbis because it propagated many superstitious beliefs, and produced a host of mystical dreamers, whose overexcited imaginations peopled the world with spirits, demons, and all kinds of good and bad influences." Many classical rabbis, especially Maimonides, viewed all such beliefs as a violation of Judaic principles of faith. Its mystic mode of explaining some commandments was applied by its commentators to all religious observances, and produced a strong tendency to substitute mystic Judaism in the place of traditional rabbinic Judaism. For example, Shabbat, the Jewish Sabbath, began to be looked upon as the embodiment of God in temporal life, and every ceremony performed on that day was considered to have an influence upon the superior world.

Elements of the Zohar crept into the liturgy of the 16th and 17th centuries, and the religious poets not only used the allegorism and symbolism of the Zohar in their compositions, but even adopted its style, e.g. the use of erotic terminology to illustrate the relations between man and God. Thus, in the language of some Jewish poets, the beloved one's curls indicate the mysteries of the Deity; sensuous pleasures, and especially intoxication, typify the highest degree of divine love as ecstatic contemplation; while the wine-room represents merely the state through which the human qualities merge or are exalted into those of God.

The Zohar is also credited with popularizing de Leon's PaRDeS codification of biblical exegesis.

Christian mysticism
According to the Jewish Encyclopedia, "The enthusiasm felt for the Zohar was shared by many Christian scholars, such as Giovanni Pico della Mirandola, Johann Reuchlin, Aegidius of Viterbo, etc., all of whom believed that the book contained proofs of the truth of Christianity. They were led to this belief by the analogies existing between some of the teachings of the Zohar and certain Christian dogmas, such as the fall and redemption of man, and the dogma of the Trinity, which seems to be expressed in the Zohar in the following terms:
The Ancient of Days has three heads. He reveals himself in three archetypes, all three forming but one. He is thus symbolized by the number Three. They are revealed in one another. [These are:] first, secret, hidden 'Wisdom'; above that the Holy Ancient One; and above Him the Unknowable One. None knows what He contains; He is above all conception. He is therefore called for man 'Non-Existing' [Ayin] (Zohar, iii. 288b).

According to the Jewish Encyclopedia, "This and other similar doctrines found in the Zohar are now known to be much older than Christianity, but the Christian scholars who were led by the similarity of these teachings to certain Christian dogmas deemed it their duty to propagate the Zohar."

Commentaries 
 The first known commentary on the book of Zohar, "Ketem Paz", was written by Simeon Lavi of Libya.
 Another important and influential commentary on Zohar, 22-volume "Or Yakar", was written by Moshe Cordovero of the Tzfat (i.e. Safed) kabbalistic school in the 16th century.
 The Vilna Gaon authored a commentary on the Zohar.
 Tzvi Hirsch of Zidichov wrote a commentary on the Zohar entitled Ateres Tzvi.
 A major commentary on the Zohar is the Sulam written by Yehuda Ashlag.
 A full translation of the Zohar into Hebrew was made by the late Daniel Frish of Jerusalem under the title Masok MiDvash.

English translations
 Zohar Pages in English, at ha-zohar.net, including the Introduction translated in English
 Berg, Michael: Zohar 23 Volume Set- The Kabbalah Centre International. Full 23 Volumes English translation with commentary and annotations.
 Matt, Daniel C., Nathan Wolski, & Joel Hecker, trans. The Zohar: Pritzker Edition (12 vols.) Stanford: Stanford University Press, 2004–2017.
 Matt, Daniel C. Zohar: Annotated and Explained. Woodstock, Vt.: SkyLights Paths Publishing Co., 2002. (Selections)
 Matt, Daniel C. Zohar: The Book of Enlightenment. New York: Paulist Press, 1983. (Selections)
 Scholem, Gershom, ed. Zohar: The Book of Splendor. New York: Schocken Books, 1963. (Selections)
 Sperling, Harry and Maurice Simon, eds. The Zohar (5 vols.). London: Soncino Press.
 Tishby, Isaiah, ed. The Wisdom of the Zohar: An Anthology of Texts (3 vols.). Translated from the Hebrew by David Goldstein. Oxford: Oxford University Press, 1989.
 Simeon Ben Yochai. Sefer ha Zohar (Vol. 1, 2, 3, 4, 5, 6, 7, 8, 9, 10, 11, 12, 13, 14, 15 English). Createspace, 2015

See also

Bahir
Baqashot
Dor Daim
Kabbalah: Primary texts
Moses de León
Sepher Yetzirah
Simeon ben Yochai
Treatise on the Left Emanation

References

Further reading
Beyer, Klaus. "Aramaic language, its distribution and subdivisions". 1986. (from reference 2 above)
Tenen, Stan, Zohar, "B'reshit, and the Meru Hypothesis: Scholars debate the origins of Zohar", Meru Foundation eTorus Newsletter #40, July 2007
Blumenthal, David R. "Three is not enough: Jewish Reflections on Trinitarian Thinking", in Ethical Monotheism, Past and Present: Essays in Honor of Wendell S. Dietrich, ed. T. Vial and M. Hadley (Providence, RI), Brown Judaic Studies:
The Encyclopedia of Jewish Myth, Magic, and Mysticism, Geoffrey Dennis, Llewellyn Worldwide, 2007
Studies in the Zohar, Yehuda Liebes (Author), SUNY Press, SUNY series in Judaica: Hermeneutics, Mysticism, and Religion, 1993
"Challenging the Master: Moshe Idel's critique of Gershom Scholem" Micha Odenheimer, MyJewishLearning.Com, Kabbalah and Mysticism
Scholem, Gershom, Zohar in Encyclopadeia Judaica, Keter Publishing
Scholem, Gershom, "Kabbalah" in Encyclopadeia Judaica, Keter Publishing
Margolies, Reuvein "Peninim U' Margolies" and "Nitzotzei Zohar" (Heb.), Mossad R' Kook
Luria, David "Kadmus Sefer Ha'Zohar" (Heb.)
Unterman, Alan Reinterpreting Mysticism and Messianism, MyJewishLearning.Com, Kabbalah and Mysticism
Adler, Jeremy, "Beyond the Law: the artistry and enduring counter-cultural power of the kabbala", Times Literary Supplement 24 February 2006, reviewing: Daniel C Matt, translator The Zohar; Arthur Green A Guide to the Zohar; Moshe Idel Kabbalah and Eros.

External links

Zohar texts

 ספר הזהר, Sefer haZohar, Zohar text in original Aramaic
 Translation:Zohar at English Wikisource
Zohar Pages in English, at ha-zohar.net, including the Introduction translated in English, and The Importance of Study of the Zohar, and more
Complete Zohar, Tikkunim, and Zohar Chadash in Aramaic with Hebrew translation, in 10 volumes of PDF, divided for yearly or 3-year learning
A four-pages-per-sheet PDF arrangement of the above, allowing for printing on 3 reams of Letter paper duplex
Zohar and Related Booklets in various formats in PDF files, at ha-zohar.net
Sefer haZohar, Mantua edition (1558), at the National Library of Israel, DjVu file
Sefer haZohar, Cremona edition (1559), at the National Library of Israel, DjVu file
Zohar text files (TXT HTML) among grimoar.cz Hebrew Kabbalistic texts collection
The Zohar in English: Bereshith to Lekh Lekha
The Zohar in English: some mystical sections
The Kabbalah Center translation of the Zohar
Original Zohar with Sulam Commentary
Daily Zohar study of Tikunei Zohar in English
Tikkunei Zohar in English, Partial (Intro and Tikkun 1-17) at ha-zohar.info; permanent link
Copy of the Zohar

Links about the Zohar
The Aramaic Language of the Zohar
7 brief video lectures about The Zohar from Kabbalah Education & Research Institute
Zohar and Later Mysticism, a short essay by Israel Abrahams
NOTES ON THE ZOHAR IN ENGLISH: An Extensive Bibliography
The Zohar Code: The Temple Calendar of King Solomon
The Zohar on the website of the National Library of Israel

Apocalyptic literature
Hebrew-language names
Jewish texts in Aramaic
Kabbalah texts
13th-century books